The 1983 E3 Harelbeke was the 26th edition of the E3 Harelbeke cycle race and was held on 26 March 1983. The race started and finished in Harelbeke. The race was won by William Tackaert of the Splendor team.

General classification

References

1983 in Belgian sport
1983